Curno is a comune (municipality) in the Province of Bergamo in the Italian region of Lombardy, located about  northeast of Milan and about  southwest of Bergamo.

The municipality of Curno contains the frazione (subdivision) Marigolda.

Curno borders the following municipalities: Bergamo, Bonate Sopra, Mozzo, Ponte San Pietro, Treviolo.

History 

Before the 1960s, Curno was a village inhabited by farmers. Then, since the years of Miracolo economico, the main sector of activities has been industry. Since the first years of the 1990s, the municipality has allowed construction of many shopping malls in the area of the comune.

Demographic evolution

References

External links